Turenne was a late 100-gun Hercule-class ship of the line of the French Navy, transformed into a Sail and Steam ship.

Service history
Soon after her commissioning, Turenne was used as a troopship in the Crimean War. Transformed into a steam and sail ship in 1858 and 1859, she conducted trials in 1860 and served during the French intervention in Mexico.

Put in ordinary from 1862, she was decommissioned in 1867 and used as a coaling hulk in Brest from 1869. She was eventually broken up around 1887.

Notes, citations, and references

Notes

Citations

References

 100-guns ships of the line

Ships of the line of the French Navy
1854 ships
Hercule
Victorian-era ships of the line